The Embassy of Spain in London is the diplomatic mission of Spain in the United Kingdom. The embassy is located at 24 Belgrave Square in the Belgravia area of London. Spain also maintains a Consulate General at 20 Draycott Place in Chelsea, a Defence Office at 3 Hans Crescent in Knightsbridge, an Education, Employment & Social Affairs Office at 20 Peel Street in Holland Park, and an Economic & Commercial Section at 66 Chiltern Street in Marylebone.

The embassy is situated in a detached, stucco house designed by Henry E. Kendall and built between 1840 and 1850 on Belgrave Square in Belgravia. The building is Grade I listed for its architectural merit.

History
In the reign of Elizabeth I, the Bishops of Ely let their palace and chapel in Ely Place to the Spanish Ambassador and, until the reign of Charles I, it was occupied by the High Representative of the Court of Spain. During this period, the chapel (now St Etheldreda's Church) was freely used by English Roman Catholics.

After the restoration of Charles II, the Spanish Embassy was re-established in London, first on Ormond Street and then at Hertford House on Manchester Square, where the Wallace Collection is now housed. Here, in 1793–96, shortly after the Roman Catholic Relief Act 1791 repealed some of the laws affecting Catholic worship, a chapel, St James's, Spanish Place, was built to designs by Joseph Bonomi on the corner of Spanish Place and Charles Street (now George Street), Westminster, largely through the efforts of Thomas Hussey, chaplain at the embassy. In 1827, the official Spanish connection with the chapel ceased.

Gallery

See also
:Category:Ambassadors of Spain to England

References

Spain
Diplomatic missions of Spain
Grade I listed buildings in the City of Westminster
Grade I listed houses in London
Houses completed in 1850
Spain–United Kingdom relations
Belgravia